Duratovci  is populated place in  Bosnia and Herzegovina, Republika Srpska, Kotor-Varoš Municipality.

In the Census Year of 1991 the village had a population of 502 residents.

Population

See also
Kotor Varoš

References

Villages in Bosnia and Herzegovina
Populated places in Kotor Varoš